The Rohingya Liberation Party (RLP) was a Rohingya political organization in Rakhine State, Myanmar (formerly Arakan, Burma). It had an armed wing called the Rohingya Liberation Army, which was led by a former mujahideen leader named Zaffar Kawal.

History 
On 15 July 1972, mujahideen leader Zaffar Kawal founded the Rohingya Liberation Party after mobilising various mujahideen factions under his command. Zaffar appointed himself Chairman of the party, Abdul Latif as Vice Chairman and Minister of Military Affairs, and Muhammad Jafar Habib as the Secretary General, a graduate from the University of Yangon. Their strength increased from 200 fighters in the beginning to up to 2,500 by 1974. The RLP was largely based in the jungles of Buthidaung. After a massive military operation by the Tatmadaw (Myanmar Armed Forces) in July 1974, Zaffar and most of his men fled across the border into Bangladesh.

See also 
 Rohingya Solidarity Organisation

References

Defunct political parties in Myanmar
Islam in Myanmar
Islamist groups
Rakhine State
Rebel groups in Myanmar
Rohingya conflict
Separatism in Myanmar